Francisco Rithely da Silva Sousa, born in Maranhão, is a Brazilian footballer who plays as a midfielder for Atlético Goianiense.

Career

Goiás
In August 2010, Rithely started his professional career in August 2010 at Goiás.

Sport Recife
On 20 May 2011, he moved to Sport Recife on a free transfer.

He was chosen best defensive midfielder in the 2013 Campeonato Pernambucano.

Career statistics
(Correct )

Honours
Goiás 
Campeonato Goiano: 2011

Sport Recife 
Copa do Nordeste: 2014 
Campeonato Pernambucano: 2014

 Atlético Goianiense
Campeonato Goiano: 2020

References

External links
 ogol
 soccerway

1991 births
Living people
Brazilian footballers
Goiás Esporte Clube players
Sport Club do Recife players
Sport Club Internacional players
Campeonato Brasileiro Série A players
Association football midfielders
Sportspeople from Maranhão